Assunta Rossi is a Filipino actress. Her sister Alessandra De Rossi is also an actress. Both sisters have won the Best Actress award at the Metro Manila Film Festival.

Filmography

Film
 Tres (segment "Amats") as Shelly Roxas
 The Super Parental Guardians (2016) Maria Felicidad "Marife" Delos Santos
 Crazy Beautiful You (2015) Carmela
 Beauty in a Bottle (2014)
 Mourning Girls (2006)
 Pinay Pie (2003)
 Bahid (2002)
 Jologs (2002)
 Kilabot at Kembot (2002)
 Hubog (2001)
 Sisid (2001)
 Red Diaries (2001)
 Baliktaran: Si Ace at Daisy (2001)
 Tugatog (2000)
 Ikaw Lamang (1999)
 Kanang kanay: Ituro Mo, Itutumba Ko (1999)
 Sumigaw Ka Hanggang Gusto Mo (1999)
 Hangga't Kaya Kong Lumaban (1998)
 Sige Subukan Mo (1998)
 Ibulong Mo sa Diyos 2 (1997)
 Sabi Mo Mahal Mo Ako Wala ng Bawian (1997)
 "Sa Kabilugan ng Buwan" (1997) Kim
 "Mahendra de Rossi" (1997) Kom

Television

Awards

References

External links

On Assunta and Alessandra’s trip to their Italian hometown

Living people
Star Magic
Filipino child actresses
Filipino people of Italian descent
Filipino film actresses
Filipino television actresses
That's Entertainment Monday Group Members
That's Entertainment (Philippine TV series)
GMA Network personalities
ABS-CBN personalities
Year of birth missing (living people)